Köpetdag Nature Reserve is a nature reserve (zapovednik) of Turkmenistan.

The reserve consists of four separate areas located at different altitudes, from 700 to 2800 meters.

It also incorporates two sanctuaries and two natural monuments:
 Mäne-Çäçe Sanctuary - established in 1976.
 Guryhowdan Sanctuary - established in 1976.
 Garaýalçy Natural Monument.
 Çarlyk Natural Monument.

Flora and Fauna 
The most critically endangered species of animals are protected here, such as leopards, wild sheep, bear goats, Indian porcupines, hyenas and other species of mammals, birds, snakes and lizards. The flora in the park is characterized by plant diversity, of which 332 are endemic. The plants that have the most rare and endangered species are Liliaceae, Orchidaceae, Rosaceae, Fabaceae and Asteraceae.

References

National Program for the Protection of the Environment, Ashgabat, 2002, pp. 149-151

External links
 https://web.archive.org/web/20090609072344/http://natureprotection.gov.tm/reserve_tm.html

Nature reserves in Turkmenistan
Protected areas established in 1976
1976 establishments in Turkmenistan